Milán Faggyas (born 1 June 1989, in Miskolc) is a Hungarian football (forward) player who currently plays for Lombard-Pápa TFC.

External links
Profile on hlsz.hu 

boon.hu: Fagyi a tarcsiban – nem a teljesítménye miatt 
topfoci.hu: Faggyas Milán: fél év kényszerszünet 

1989 births
Living people
Sportspeople from Miskolc
Hungarian footballers
Association football forwards
Diósgyőri VTK players
Debreceni VSC players
SV Mattersburg players
Budapest Honvéd FC players
Szolnoki MÁV FC footballers
Soproni VSE players
Lombard-Pápa TFC footballers
Nemzeti Bajnokság I players
Hungarian expatriate footballers
Expatriate footballers in Austria
Hungarian expatriate sportspeople in Austria